Papyrus 115 (P. Oxy. 4499), designated by  (in the Gregory-Aland numbering of New Testament manuscripts) is a fragmented manuscript of the New Testament written in Greek on papyrus. It consists of 26 fragments of a codex containing parts of the Book of Revelation.  Using the study of comparative writing styles (palaeography), the manuscript is dated to the third century, c. 225-275 AD. Scholars Bernard Pyne Grenfell and Arthur Hunt discovered the papyrus in Oxyrhynchus, Egypt.

 was not deciphered and published until 2011. It is currently housed at the Ashmolean Museum.

Description 
The original codex had 33-36 lines per page of 15.5 cm by 23.5 cm. The surviving text includes Revelation 2:1-3, 13-15, 27-29; 3:10-12; 5:8-9; 6:5-6; 8:3-8, 11-13; 9:1-5, 7-16, 18-21; 10:1-4, 8-11; 11:1-5, 8-15, 18-19; 12:1-5, 8-10, 12-17; 13:1-3, 6-16, 18; 14:1-3, 5-7, 10-11, 14-15, 18-20; 15:1, 4-7.

The manuscript uses the Greek Numeral system, with no number extant as being written out in full.

The manuscript is a witness to the Alexandrian text-type, following the text of Codex Alexandrinus (A) and Codex Ephraemi Rescriptus (C).

According to the transcription of the INTF, a conjectured reading of the manuscript, due to the space left, is [] η  (666 or 616), therefore not giving a definite number to the beast.

Textual variants

 και το τριτον της σεληνης : 
 omit. : 
 incl. :  A

 ο απολλυων :  1740
 απολλυων :   pc gig 2344

/τεσσάρων
 incl. :  Majority of manuscripts vgcl sy
 omit. :   A 0207 1611 2053 2344 pc lat sy co

 λεγουσαι :    C 051 1006 1611 1841 1854 2329 2344 
 λεγοντες : A 2053 2351 .

 πυρρος μεγας :   2053 
 μεγας πυρρος : A P 051 1841 pm lat sa
 πυρος μεγας : C 046 1611 1854 2329 2344 pm sy

 το ονομα αυτου : C 1854 2053 pc Ir Prim.
 το ονομα :   co Bea.
 τα ονοματα αυτων :   P 051 1006 1841 2329 al lat

εκ του ουρανου (out of heaven)
 omit. :  175.
 incl. :   A Majority of manuscripts

 κατοικουντας :  A 2049 69.
 καθημενους :   C P 1611 1854 2053 2329 pc sy Or

 (2600) : .
 / χιλιων εξακοσιων (1600) :   A 42 69 82 93 177 325 456 498 627 699 1849 2138 2329 Majority of manuscripts

See also 
 List of New Testament papyri
 Oxyrhynchus papyri
 Stigma (letter)

References

Further reading 
 Juan Chapa, Oxyrynchus Papyri 66:11-39. (no. 4499).
 Philip W. Comfort and David P. Barrett, The Text of the Earliest New Testament Greek Manuscripts, (Wheaton, Illinois: Tyndale House Publishers, 2001), pp. 664–677.
 David C. Parker, A new Oxyrhynchus Papyrus of Revelation: P115 (P. Oxy. 4499), in: Manuscripts, Texts, Theology: Collected Papers, 1977-2007, Walter de Gruyter, Berlin, 2009, pp. 73–92.

External links 
 Oxford University 'P. Oxy. LXVI 4499'
 Images of the fragments of P. Oxy. LXVI 4499

New Testament papyri
4499
3rd-century biblical manuscripts
Egyptian papyri
Early Greek manuscripts of the New Testament
Book of Revelation papyri